Gorka Larrucea Arrien (born 24 February 1993) is a Spanish footballer who plays as a central midfielder for Liga II club Dinamo București.

Club career
Larrucea was born in Guernica, Biscay, Basque Country, and finished his formation with hometown club Gernika Club. He made his first team debut in the 2010–11 season, in Tercera División.

Larrucea subsequently became a regular starter for the club, achieving promotion to Segunda División B in 2015. On 2 July 2019, he moved to fellow third division side Real Unión on a one-year contract.

On 22 July 2020, Larrucea joined SD Amorebieta also in the third level, and was a regular during the campaign as his side achieved a first-ever promotion to Segunda División. He made his professional debut on 14 August 2021, starting in a 0–2 away loss against Girona FC.

In August 2022, he signed a contract with Romanian club Dinamo București.

Personal life
Larrucea's older brother Ander is also a footballer. A left back, both played together at Gernika for four years.

References

External links

1993 births
Living people
People from Guernica
Spanish footballers
Footballers from the Basque Country (autonomous community)
Association football midfielders
Segunda División players
Segunda División B players
Tercera División players
Liga II players
Gernika Club footballers
Real Unión footballers
SD Amorebieta footballers
FC Dinamo București players
Sportspeople from Biscay
Expatriate footballers in Romania
Spanish expatriate sportspeople in Romania